was a junior college in Sapporo, Japan, which was founded in 1950 and closed in 2001, The predecessor of the school, Sapporo Fuji girls' high school, was founded in 1925.

Universities and colleges in Hokkaido
Educational institutions established in 1950
Japanese junior colleges
Private universities and colleges in Japan
Educational institutions disestablished in 2001
1950 establishments in Japan
2001 disestablishments in Japan